Gergely Horváth (born 5 June 1975 in Budapest) is a retired Hungarian male javelin thrower and seven time national champion. His personal best throw is 81.55 metres, achieved in August 2003 in Nyíregyháza, which is also the Hungarian national record.

In 2007 Horváth was found guilty of boldenone doping. The sample was delivered on 22 July 2006 in an in-competition test in Debrecen. He received a suspension by the IAAF from September 2006 to September 2008, as well as disqualification of all results accomplished since the day he was tested.

Achievements

Seasonal bests by year
1998 - 80.53
1999 - 78.36
2000 - 79.57
2001 - 80.80
2002 - 81.14
2003 - 81.55
2004 - 80.08
2005 - 80.91
2006 - 77.23
2009 - 68.85

See also
List of doping cases in athletics

References

External links

1975 births
Living people
Hungarian male javelin throwers
Athletes (track and field) at the 2004 Summer Olympics
Olympic athletes of Hungary
Doping cases in athletics
Hungarian sportspeople in doping cases
Athletes from Budapest
Universiade medalists in athletics (track and field)
Universiade bronze medalists for Hungary
Medalists at the 2001 Summer Universiade